The 1985–86 Ball State Cardinals men's basketball team represented Ball State University as a member of the Mid-American Conference during the 1985–86 NCAA Division I men's basketball season. The Cardinals were led by head coach Al Brown and played their home games at Irving Gymnasium in Muncie, Indiana. After finishing in third place during the MAC regular season, Ball State won the MAC tournament to receive the conference's automatic bid to the NCAA tournament. As No. 14 seed in the Southeast region, the Cardinals were beaten by No. 3 seed Memphis State in the opening round, 95–63. The team finished with a record of 21–10 (11–7 MAC).

Roster

Schedule and results

|-
!colspan=9 style=| Non-conference regular season

|-
!colspan=9 style=| MAC regular season

|-
!colspan=9 style=| MAC tournament

|-
!colspan=9 style=| NCAA tournament

References

1985–86 Mid-American Conference men's basketball season
1989-90
1985 in sports in Indiana
1986 in sports in Indiana
1986 NCAA Division I men's basketball tournament participants